Ephelictis is a genus of moths in the family Gelechiidae.

Species
 Ephelictis neochalca Meyrick, 1904
 Ephelictis megalarthra Meyrick, 1904

References

Gelechiinae
Taxa named by Edward Meyrick
Moth genera